Blackfish is a common name for several species of fish.

Blackfish may also refer to:
 Blackfish, a catch-all slang term for small, dark-colored toothed whales such as the pygmy sperm whale, the false killer whale, and the short-finned pilot whale
 Blackfish (film), a 2013 documentary focusing on the orca Tilikum held by SeaWorld 
 The Black Fish, the former name of FishAct, a marine conservation organization
 , a United States Navy submarine, named for the blackfish, any one of several small, toothed whales
 Blakfish, an English math rock band that disbanded in 2010
 Blackfish (Shawnee leader)
 Brynden Tully, a character in George R.R. Martin's A Song of Ice and Fire series
 Blackfish Publishing, a British magazine publisher

See also
Blackfishing, white social media influencers who are perceived to be appropriating the look of Black women